Klusek may refer to:

Klusek, Gostynin County, Poland
Klusek, Pułtusk County, Poland